Vadakkancheri-I is a village in Palakkad district in the state of Kerala, India. It is a part of the Vadakkancheri gram panchayat along with Vadakkancheri-II.

Demographics
 India census, Vadakkancheri-I had a population of 20,402 with 9,986 males and 10,416 females.

References

Villages in Palakkad district